Kirikuraba Nature Reserve is a nature reserve which is located in Jõgeva County, Estonia.

The area of the nature reserve is 

The protected area was founded in 2005 on the basis of the Kirikuraba protected area for western capercaillie.

References

Nature reserves in Estonia
Geography of Jõgeva County